Sir George Parker, 2nd Baronet (ca. 1673 – 14 May 1727), of Ratton, Sussex, was an English politician. He was a Member of Parliament (MP) for Sussex from 1705 to 1708 and again from 1710 to 1713.

He succeeded as second baronet on 30 November 1691. He died on 14 May 1727.

He married Mary Bagot (1672-1727) eldest daughter of Sir Walter Bagot, 3rd Baronet (1644-1704) of Blithfield, Staffordshire in 1692.

References

1670s births
1727 deaths
British MPs 1710–1713
Baronets in the Baronetage of England
English MPs 1705–1707
Members of the Parliament of Great Britain for English constituencies
Year of birth uncertain
People from Eastbourne
British MPs 1707–1708